Hugh William Inggs (born 15 May 1938) is a South African professional golfer.

Professional career
Inggs was born in Boksburg, South Africa. He started to play golf at the age of 15 and turned pro five years later.

In 1965, he recorded a 3rd-place finish at the South African Open behind Gary Player. In February 1969, he would finish 2nd place to compatriot Graham Henning at the General Motors Open. Although these were good placings they would also prefigure a tough-luck career as Inggs would ultimately record well over a dozen 2nd and 3rd place finishes but would rarely win.

He did, however, finally win a month later in March 1969 at the Rhodesian Masters. Inggs avenged the previous month's defeat to Graham Henning, defeating his fellow South African by a shot. He would successfully defend his title the following year.

In April 1969, Inggs was one of 15 players who qualified for the PGA Tour. He made his debut at the Western Open in June and played a number of events, finishing with the Canadian Open at the end of July. In the Minnesota Golf Classic, an event played at the same time as the 1969 Open Championship, he was joint runner-up behind Frank Beard.

Late in his career, he would play the European Senior Tour from 1992 to 2001. He played part-time for the first three seasons, making little mark, but was much more successful in his fourth season. He finished in the top-10 in half of the eight events he played, including a runner-up at the 1995 London Seniors Masters to fellow South African John Bland. He would finish 13th on that season's Order of Merit. His next best finish would be 3rd place at the 1998 Lawrence Batley Seniors.

Personal life
Inggs has been married to Alma since 1964. He has two adult children with her, Graeme and David.

Professional wins (2)

South African circuit wins (2)
1969 Rhodesian Masters
1970 Rhodesian Masters

See also
Spring 1969 PGA Tour Qualifying School graduates

References

External links

South African male golfers
Sunshine Tour golfers
PGA Tour golfers
European Senior Tour golfers
People from Boksburg
1938 births
Living people